The women's 200 metre butterfly swimming competition at the 2002 Asian Games in Busan was held on 30 September at the Sajik Swimming Pool.

Schedule
All times are Korea Standard Time (UTC+09:00)

Records

Results

Heats

Final

References 

2002 Asian Games Report, Page 223
Results

Swimming at the 2002 Asian Games